Michael Frisch (born 4 September 1957) is a German politician of Alternative for Germany (AfD). He has been leader of the party's Rhineland-Palatinate branch since November 2019.

Frisch teaches mathematics and Catholic religion at the vocational school for nutrition, home economics and social affairs in Trier. A former member of the CDU, he became a member of AfD in 2013. On 13 March 2016, he was elected to the Landtag of Rhineland-Palatinate in the 2016 state election. Frisch is AfD district chairman in Trier and state board member of AfD Rhineland-Palatinate. On 25 May 2014, he became chairman of the AfD parliamentary group in the Trier city council. In November 2019, he was elected state chairman of the Rhineland-Palatinate AfD. In September 2020, he was chosen as the party's lead candidate for the 2021 state election.

References

1957 births
Living people
People from Trier
Alternative for Germany politicians
21st-century German politicians